Aleksandr Shestyuk (born 5 June 2002) is a Belarusian professional footballer who plays for BATE Borisov.

Club career
On 16 February 2022, Shestyuk was loaned to RFS in Latvia.

On 2 July 2022, Shestyuk returned to Dynamo Brest.

References

External links 
 
 

2002 births
Sportspeople from Brest, Belarus
Living people
Belarusian footballers
Belarus youth international footballers
Belarus under-21 international footballers
Association football forwards
FC Dynamo Brest players
FC Nizhny Novgorod (2015) players
FK RFS players
FC BATE Borisov players
Belarusian Premier League players
Belarusian expatriate footballers
Expatriate footballers in Russia
Belarusian expatriate sportspeople in Russia
Expatriate footballers in Latvia
Belarusian expatriate sportspeople in Latvia